Lophocampa testacea is a moth of the family Erebidae. It was described by Heinrich Benno Möschler in 1878. It is found in French Guiana, Suriname, Brazil and Trinidad.

References

 

testacea
Moths described in 1878